The Curtiss OXX was an early, dual ignition water-cooled V-8 aero engine derived from the Curtiss OX.

Variants
Curtiss OXX-2
Curtiss OXX-3
Curtiss OXX-5
Curtiss OXX-6

Applications
 Aeromarine 39
 Aeromarine 40
 Burgess-Dunne
 Curtiss Autoplane
 Curtiss F
 Curtiss FL
 Curtiss JN-4
 Curtiss MF
 Curtiss N-9
 Standard J-1

Engines on display
 The Kansas Aviation Museum has an OXX-6 on display.
 The Yanks Air Museum, Chino, CA has an OXX-6 on display
The Cradle of Aviation Museum, Garden City, NY has an OXX-2 on exhibit.

Specifications (OXX-6)

See also
List of aircraft engines

References

 Molson, K. M. (1972) "The Curtiss OX-5 Engine." Journal of the American Aviation Historical Society.
 US Department of Transportation Federal Aviation Administration Type Certificate Data Sheet Curtiss OXX-6 (Group 2 - Domestic engines approved prior to 7/15/29)

OXX
1910s aircraft piston engines